Chris Cagle is the second studio album by the American country music artist of the same name. Released in 2003 on Capitol Records Nashville, it contains the singles "What a Beautiful Day", "Chicks Dig It", and "I'd Be Lying". Respectively, these peaked at No. 4, No. 5 and No. 39 on the U.S. country singles charts. As with his debut album, Chris Cagle is certified gold in the U.S. for shipments of 500,000 copies.

Track listing

Personnel

Musicians 
Chris Cagle – lead vocals
John Carroll – electric guitar
Shannon Forrest – percussion, drums
Chris McHugh – percussion, drums, Loop Programming
Michael Noble – acoustic guitar
Gary Smith – keyboards, String Arrangements, Strings
Ilya Toshinsky – banjo, electric guitar, classical guitar, resonator guitar
Steve Turner – drums
John Willis – acoustic guitar
Robert Wright – bass guitar, background vocals
Jonathan Yudkin – fiddle, mandolin, Strings, Cello, Mandocello, String Arrangements, octofone

Production 
Joanna Carter – Art Direction
Marina Chavez – Photography
Mike "Frog" Griffith – Production Coordination
Robert Hadley – Mastering
Jennifer Kemp – Stylist
Joe Rogers – Design
Doug Sax – Mastering
Paula Turner – Make-Up, Hair Stylist
Craig White – Engineer, Digital Editing, Mixing
Hank Williams – Mastering
Casey Wood – Assistant
Robert Wright - Producer, Engineer, Digital Editing

Chart performance

Weekly charts

Year-end charts

Certifications

References

2003 albums
Chris Cagle albums
Capitol Records albums